Bowers Group founded in 1915 manufacture test equipment and measuring instruments. The group includes Baty International, Bowers Export, Bowers UK, Moore & Wright, and CV Instruments.

History
Originally known as 'Bowers Precision Engineers', established as a toolmaker in Bradford in 1915.  In 1994 it developed a 3-point internal bore micrometer. In 1979 'Bowers Internal Gauge Company Limited' was found by Roger Bowers. The company moved to Bradford, West Yorkshire in 1989. In 2000, Bowers Metrological Group was founded. In 2009, Bowers assisted the Nuclear Advanced Manufacturing Research Centre accurately measure internal screw threads. Baty International was acquired in 2010.

References

Manufacturing companies of the United Kingdom
Measuring instruments
Manufacturing companies established in 1915
British companies established in 1915
1915 establishments in England
Manufacturing companies based in Bradford